Piletocera scotochroa is a moth in the family Crambidae. It was described by George Hampson in 1917. It is found on Ghizo Island in the Solomon Islands.

References

scotochroa
Endemic fauna of the Solomon Islands
Insects of the Solomon Islands
Moths of Oceania
Moths described in 1917
Taxa named by George Hampson